Lisa Corrigan (born 2 December 1984 in Blacktown, New South Wales) is an Australian middle-distance runner and the current Australian record holder over the one mile where she set a time of 4.22.6 in 2007. She set her personal best time of 4:05.25, by winning the women's 1500 metres at the Telstra Athletics Series in Sydney. She ran a personal best to beat Tamsyn Lewis over the 800m in 2007 in 2.01.5. She has represented Australia at the Oceania championships 1999, youth commonwealth games 2000, World youth championships 2001, Ekiden relays, Melbourne commonwealth Games 2006, world championships 2007 and Olympic Games 2008.

Corrigan represented Australia at the 2008 Summer Olympics in Beijing, where she competed in the 1500 metres. She ran in the second heat against ten other athletes, including Ukraine's Iryna Lishchynska, who eventually won the silver medal in the final. She finished the race in ninth place by twenty-seven hundredths of a second (0.27) behind United States' Erin Donohue, outside her personal best time of 4:16.32.

Corrigan has been Australian champion over 800m & 1500m numerous times in her career and has won many road running races in the process. Corrigan attempted to qualify for the 2012 London Olympic Games over the 5000m however she ruptured her achillies tendon and has battled this persistent Achilles injury which saw her retire from the sport in 2013.

Corrigan has since worked for in development Athletics NSW and been a PE teacher at various schools over the years. Her biggest achievement to date has been marrying her best friend Dean Sintonen and the birth of their first daughter, Harper.

Achievements 

2000 Junior Commonwealth Games, 800m, Silver. 
2001 World Youth Championships, 800m, 5th place 
2006 Commonwealth Games, 1500m, Finalist 11th
2007 World Championships, 1500m, Semi Finalist, 8th 
2008 Olympic Games, Semi Finalist, 9th

References

External links

Profile – Australian Olympic Team
NBC 2008 Olympics profile

1984 births
Living people
Australian female middle-distance runners
Olympic athletes of Australia
Athletes (track and field) at the 2008 Summer Olympics
Athletes from Sydney
ACT Academy of Sport alumni
21st-century Australian women
20th-century Australian women